Siah Gol Chal (also Romanized as Sīāh Gol Chāl; also known as Sīāhkal Chāl) is a village in Rahimabad Rural District, Rahimabad District, Rudsar County, Gilan Province, Iran. At the 2006 census, its population was 147, in 33 families.

References 

Populated places in Rudsar County